The 2022 season for the  is its 16th season, all of which have been as a UCI WorldTeam. The team returned to a name that represents the country of Kazakhstan after the team had two main sponsors in 2021. They use Wilier bicycles, Shimano drivetrain, Corima wheels and Giordana clothing.

Team roster 

 

Riders who joined the team for the 2022 season

Riders who left the team during or after the 2021 season

Season victories

National, Continental, and World Champions

Notes

References

External links 

 

Astana Qazaqstan Team
2022